Susan Hunter (born 5 October 1955) is a New Zealand swimmer. She competed at the 1972 Summer Olympics and the 1976 Summer Olympics.

References

External links
 

1955 births
Living people
New Zealand female swimmers
Olympic swimmers of New Zealand
Swimmers at the 1972 Summer Olympics
Swimmers at the 1976 Summer Olympics
Swimmers at the 1974 British Commonwealth Games
Commonwealth Games bronze medallists for New Zealand
Commonwealth Games medallists in swimming
Swimmers from Christchurch
20th-century New Zealand women
Medallists at the 1974 British Commonwealth Games